Pokrovskoye is a rural locality (a selo) in Yavengskoye Rural Settlement, Vozhegodsky District, Vologda Oblast, Russia. The population was 102 as of 2002.

Geography 
Pokrovskoye is located 18 km north of Vozhega (the district's administrative centre) by road. Baza is the nearest rural locality.

References 

Rural localities in Vozhegodsky District